Płutowo is a village in the administrative district of Gmina Kijewo Królewskie, within Chełmno County, Kuyavian-Pomeranian Voivodeship, in north-central Poland.

The length of the ravine is 1.2 km and its depth around 57 metres from the top down to the water level.

World War II
In the fall of 1939 following the invasion of Poland the Nazi German occupational authorities set up a temporary concentration camp in Płutowo at a manor once owned by von Alvensleben family. The Polish prisoners brought to the camp came from the area of Ziemia chełmińska (Chełmno land). Over 200 victims were murdered at a nearby forest by the German Volksdeutscher Selbstschutz executioners, along the road to Szymborno.

References

Villages in Chełmno County
Nature reserves in Poland